Tarqui is a rural parish (parroquia) in Cuenca Canton, Azuay, Ecuador.

It encompasses the communities of Atucloma, Santa Lucrecia, Tañiloma, Acchayacu, Bellavista, Las Américas - Estación, Gullanzhapa, Morascalle, Tutupali Chico, Tutupali Grande, Manzanapamba, El Verde, Chaullayacu, Santa Rosa, Chilcatotora, Parcoloma, San Pedro de Yunga, Chilcachapar, Cotapamba, Francesurco, San Francisco de Totorillas, Rosa de Oro, Santa Teresa, and Gulagpugro.

Further reading
www.vive-cuenca.com

Parishes of Ecuador
Populated places in Azuay Province
Cuenca, Ecuador